Jude Cole is the debut album by American singer-songwriter Jude Cole. The album is one of the first to feature tenor saxophonist Kenny G, performing on tracks 3 and 5.

Track listing
All songs written or co-written by Jude Cole.  Co-writers, where noted, in parenthesis.
 "Like Lovers Do" (4:42)
 "Walls That Bend" (3:45) (Cole, John Corey)
 "You Were In My Heart" (5:00)
 "Something That You Want" (4:21) (Cole, Alan Pasqua)
 "Life of Luxury" (4:36) (Cole, Corey, Deborah Neal)
 "The Hurt" (4:36)
 "Everyone's In Love" (4:23) (Cole, Sara Allen)
 "Better Days" (3:58) (Cole, John Bettis)
 "Walk On Water" (4:05)
 "Crying Mary" (6:12)

Personnel
Jude Cole - lead and backing vocals, guitars, bass
Rob Mounsey - keyboards
Mickey Curry - drums
Jimmy Bralower - drum programming
Jeff Bova - keyboards
Jimmy Maelin (sic) - percussion
Kenny G - tenor saxophone
Ron Skies - synth string programming
Russ Titelman - synth string arrangement
Robby Kilgore - keyboards

References

1987 debut albums
Jude Cole albums
Albums produced by Russ Titelman
Reprise Records albums